Northam Holdings is an independent integrated PGM producer listed on the JSE. The primary operations are centered on their three wholly owned mines, Zondereinde, Booysendal and Eland, and the additional metallurgical operations at Zondereinde including a smelter and base metals removal plant. Northam’s three main products mined are platinum, palladium and rhodium and are consumed by industries such as the motor manufacturing, jewellery and other industrial sectors.

Background
Northam Platinum has three main mines in South Africa located at Zondereinde, Limpopo Province, Booysendal, Mpumalanga and Eland North West. Located close to Thabazimbi, the Zondereinde mine produces 280,000oz of refined PGMs a year in 2016 and has an expected life of more than 20 years. Close by is Northam Chrome that obtains chrome from the material mined from Zondereinde. The Booysendal site consists of three mines, Booysendal UG2 North, Booysendal Merensky North and Booysendal South. UG2 North opened in July 2013 and produces 160,000oz a year with a 105 million ounces available. Merensky North is under development and the South mine also consists of the Everest platinum mine purchased from Aquarius Platinum in 2015. In a joint venture project, it has a 7.5% interest the Pandora mine with Anglo American Platinum and Lonmin. Northam also has a 50% interest in the Dwaalkop join venture and a 51% interest in the Kokerboom exploration joint in the Northern Cape.

During February 2017, Northam announced a proposal to purchase the Eland platinum mine for R135 million from its owner Glencore. The mine, said to have 21.3 million ounces of product, had been closed since 2015, due to price falls and difficulties in its operations. The purchase includes the mines two mining rights, surface and underground infrastructure. Northam had also reached marketing deal for the sale of its chrome product through Glencore.

Ownership
The shares of the stock of Northern Platinum are traded on the JSE. As at June 30, 2016, the shareholding in the group's stock consisting of 509,781,212 shares as depicted in the table below:

The shareholders in 2016 can be broken down as follows:
 South African 89.9%
 North America 5.6%
 Europe/United Kingdom 1.8%
 World 2.7%

Carbon footprint
Northam Platinum reported Total CO2e emissions (Direct + Indirect) for 30 June 2020 at 1,077 Kt (+72/+7.1% y-o-y). The growth accelerated relative to the long-term trend (+5% CAGR) observed since 2Q'15.

References

External links 
 www.northam.co.za

Companies based in Johannesburg
Palladium mining companies
Platinum mining companies
Mining companies of South Africa
Companies listed on the Johannesburg Stock Exchange